"Set in Stone" is a song by Australian recording artist Guy Sebastian. It was released as the second single from Sebastian's extended play Part 1 (2016).

The inspiration for this song came when Sebastian was in Bali. Sebastian said: "You know, there are a lot of things in life that are fleeting, there are a lot of things that come and go, people that come and go and experiences that come and go, but then there's those things that are there forever. The people that are there forever that support you and love you. This song is all about holding onto those things."

In an interview with KIIS FM's Kyle and Jackie O, Sebastian gave more detail as to the inspiration and recalled how he witnessed a scooter accident that left him holding a young boy's hand as he died on the side of the road. Sebastian said "The [kid] sort of just ended up stopping breathing, Literally as I was holding his hand. I still get flashbacks of it, because I'll never get that image of that kid out of my head."

Sebastian performed the song live on The X Factor Australia on 7 November 2016 and on Sunrise on 11 November.

"Set in Stone" was also included on Sebastian's eighth studio album, Conscious (2017).

Music video
The music video for "Set in Stone" was released on 7 November 2016.

AuspOp said: "It's a staggeringly beautiful song that resonates more with each and every listen. And the clip is one of the strongest to come out of the Sony Australia stable in years."

Track listing
Digital download
"Set in Stone" – 3:40

Charts

Certifications

References

2016 singles
Guy Sebastian songs
Sony Music Australia singles
Songs written by Guy Sebastian
2016 songs